Diving Australia is the organization that oversees the sport of Diving in Australia. It is affiliated to Sport Australia, FINA and the Oceania Swimming Association. It has its headquarters in Chandler, Queensland.

References

External links
 

Sports governing bodies in Australia
Diving in Australia